The Astronomical Society of India (ASI) is an Indian society of professional astronomers and other professionals from related disciplines. It was founded in 1972, with Vainu Bappu being the founder President of the Society, and as of 2010 has a membership of approximately 1000. Its registered office is at the Astronomy Department, Osmania University, Hyderabad, India. Its primary objective is the promotion of Astronomy and related branches of science. It organises meetings, supports and tries to popularise Astronomy and related subjects and publishes the Bulletin of the Astronomical Society of India.

Prof. Rajaram Nityananda of the National Centre for Radio Astrophysics at the Tata Institute of Fundamental Research, Ganeshkhind, 
Pune is the Society's President.

The Society makes a series of awards, the most prestigious of which is the Prof. M. K. Vainu Bappu Gold Medal awarded once every two years to "honour exceptional contributions to Astronomy and Astrophysics by young scientists anywhere in the world." Previous award winners include:
 1986 Yasuo Fukui
 1988 George Efstathiou and Shrinivas Kulkarni
 1990 D.J. Saikia and Dipankar Bhattacharya
 1992 Pawan Kumar
 1994 Matthew Colless
 1996 Sarbani Basu
 1998 Peter Martinez
 2000 Biswajit Paul and Alycia J. Weinberger
 2002 Brian P. Schmidt
 2004 R. Srianand and Ray Jayawardhana
 2006 Banibrata Mukhopadhyay
 2008 Niayesh Afshordi and Nissim Kanekar
 2010 Marta Burgay and Parampreet Singh

The Society also runs two prestigious lectures: the Modali Endowment Lecture and the R. C. Gupta Endowment Lecture.

Previous Organisation
A previous organisation of the same name existed between July 1910 and circa 1922. It was founded to promote astronomy following an appearance of Halley’s Comet. Initially there was strong support for such a society and by 30 September 1911 there were 239 members (192 original and a net 47 added during the first session). The society was run along similar lines to the British Astronomical Association. Sections were formed for general observation, meteors, Earth’s Moon and variable stars, experts were appointed to advise on instrumental matters and photography. A Library was established. The society was based in Calcutta and nearby Barrackpore. Sidney Gerald Burrard and John Evershed were Vice Presidents. However the organisation faded to obscurity following the departure from India of one of the principal members, Herbert Gerard Tomkins.

Publications 
 Bulletin of the Astronomical Society of India

See also 
 Akash Mitra Mandal
 List of astronomical societies

References

External links 
 

Astronomy organizations
Scientific organizations established in 1972
Scientific organisations based in India
Organisations based in Hyderabad, India
1972 establishments in Andhra Pradesh
Astronomy in India